Crepicephalus is an extinct genus from a well-known class of fossil marine arthropods, the trilobites. It lived from 501 to 490 million years ago during the Dresbachian faunal stage of the late Cambrian Period.

Reassigned species 
Some species, previously described as Crepicephalus have since been moved to other genera.
 C. angusta = Kochaspis angusta
 C. convexus = Crepicephalina convexa
 C. liliana = Kochaspis liliana
 C. nitidus = Dunderbergia nitida
 C. quadrans = Ehmaniella quadrans
 C. unca = Uncaspis unca

References

Ptychopariida genera
Cambrian trilobites
Extinct animals of North America
Paleozoic life of Newfoundland and Labrador
Paleozoic life of the Northwest Territories
Paleozoic life of Yukon